The 1972 Centennial Cup is the second Tier II Junior "A" 1972 ice hockey National Championship for the Canadian Junior A Hockey League.

The Centennial Cup was competed for by the winners of the Western Canadian Champions and the Eastern Canadian Champions.

The finals were hosted by the Guelph CMC's in the city of Guelph, Ontario.

History
Guelph CMC's forward Paul Fendley died days after game four of the championship series after hitting his head on the ice during game four.  He was the CMC's leading scorer.

The Playoffs

Prior to Regionals
Moncton Hawks (NBJHL) defeated St. John's Jr. Capitals (Independent) 3-games-to-1
Thunder Bay Vulcans (TBJHL) defeated Smiths Falls Bears (CJHL) 4-games-to-1
Guelph CMC's (SOJHL) defeated Sault Ste. Marie Greyhounds (NOJHA) 3-games-to-none
St. John's Jr. Capitals (Independent) defeated Gander Jr. Flyers (NJAHL) 2-games-to-1

MCC Finals

Regional Championships
Abbott Cup: Red Deer Rustlers
Eastern Champions: Guelph CMC's

Doyle Cup: Red Deer Rustlers
Anavet Cup: Humboldt Broncos
Dudley Hewitt Cup:  Guelph CMC's
Callaghan Cup: Charlottetown Islanders

Roll of League Champions
AJHL: Red Deer Rustlers
BCJHL: Vernon Essos
CJHL: Smiths Falls Bears
Independent: Charlottetown Isles
MJHL: Dauphin Kings
NBJHL: Moncton Hawks
NJAHL: Gander Jr. Flyers
NOJHA: Sault Ste. Marie Greyhounds
SJHL: Humboldt Broncos
SOJAHL: Guelph CMC's
TBJHL: Thunder Bay Vulcans

See also
Canadian Junior A Hockey League
Royal Bank Cup
Anavet Cup
Doyle Cup
Dudley Hewitt Cup
Fred Page Cup
Abbott Cup
Mowat Cup

External links
Royal Bank Cup Website

1972
Cup